The 1893 Notre Dame football team was an American football team that represented the University of Notre Dame in the 1893 college football season. The team had no coach, compiled a 4–1 record, and outscored its opponents by a combined total of 92 to 24.

Schedule

References

Notre Dame
Notre Dame Fighting Irish football seasons
Notre Dame football